Guangzhou Hotel is a hotel in Guangzhou, China. It was constructed in 1968 amid the Cultural Revolution. With 27 floors, on opening it surpassed Park Hotel in Shanghai as the tallest building in China.

See also
List of tallest buildings in Guangzhou
Baiyun Hotel

References

Hotels in Guangzhou
1968 establishments in China
Hotels established in 1968
Hotel buildings completed in 1968